Ezhudesam is a town panchayat  in Kanniyakumari district  in the state of Tamil Nadu, India.

Demographics
At the 2011 Census of India, Ezhudesam had a population of 24,657. Males constituted 52% of the population and females 48%. Ezhudesam had an average literacy rate of 90%, higher than the national average of 74%: male literacy was 92%, and female literacy was 87%. 11% of the population was under 6 years of age.

According to the previous census in 2001, Ezhudesam had a population of 18,652. Males constituted 50% of the population and females 50%. Ezhudesam had an average literacy rate of 80%, higher than the national average of 59.5%: male literacy was 83%, and female literacy was 77%. 10% of the population was under 6 years of age.

References

Cities and towns in Kanyakumari district